Marrero is a Hispanic surname that may refer to
Alejandro Rodríguez Marrero (born 1994), Spanish football player
Aimeé García Marrero (born 1972), Cuban painter and mixed media artist
Aníbal Marrero Pérez (1949–2005), Puerto Rican politician 
Beverly Marrero (born 1939), American politician 
Carlos Marrero (born 1914), Venezuelan sports shooter 
Carmelo Marrero (born 1981), American mixed martial artist 
Chris Marrero (born 1988), American baseball player
Christian Marrero (born 1986), American baseball coach
Claudio Marrero (born 1986), boxer from the Dominican Republic 
Connie Marrero (1911–2014), Cuban baseball pitcher
Cristo Marrero Henríquez (born 1978), Spanish football forward
David Marrero (born 1980), Spanish tennis player
Deven Marrero (born 1990) American baseball player, nephew of Eli and cousin of Chris 
Diosdado González Marrero, Cuban dissident 
Domingo Marrero Navarro (1909–1960), Puerto Rican writer and educator
Eddie Marrero (born 1962), American actor 
Eli Marrero (born 1973), American baseball player, uncle of Chris and Deven 
Elizabeth Marrero (born 1963), Puerto Rican performance artist, comedian, and drag king 
Héctor Hernández Marrero (born 1995), Spanish football forward
Juan Hilario Marrero (1905–1989), Spanish association football player
José Marrero (born 1957), Cuban sprint canoer 
Joseph Marrero (born 1993), Puerto Rican association football player
Juanma (footballer, born 1982) (born Juan Manuel Marrero Monzón in 1982), Spanish football player
Lawrence Marrero (1900–1959), American jazz banjoist 
Louis H. Marrero (1847–1921), American soldier, politician and businessman
Luis Raul Marrero (born 1974), Puerto Rican rapper and songwriter 
Lynnette Marrero, American bartender, mixologist and philanthropist 
Marialejandra Marrero (born 1991), Venezuelan internet personality 
Mirtha Marrero American baseball pitcher 
Marta Marrero (born 1983), Spanish tennis player
Martika (born Marta Marrero in 1969), American singer-songwriter and actress
Oreste Marrero (born 1969), American baseball first baseman
Otmara Marrero (born 1989), American actress
Ramón Marrero Aristy (1914–1959), Dominican author, journalist, politician and historian 
Roberta Marrero (born 1972), Spanish artist, singer, and actress
Victor Marrero (born 1941), American judge 
Víctor Marrero Padilla, Puerto Rican politician 
Yaniet Marrero Lopez (born 1983), Cuban chess player
Young M.A (Katorah Marrero) (born 1992), American rapper and entrepreneur  

Spanish-language surnames